Carex nudata is a species of true sedge known by several common names, including torrent sedge, California black-flowering sedge, Dudley's sedge, and naked sedge.

Distribution
This sedge is found in California, Oregon, and Washington. It grows amidst rocks and developing a dense mounding bunchgrass type form, in coastal and in montane habitats.

Description
Carex nudata is a bright green sedge which grows in mounds below the high-water mark in marshes and on river banks. It bears long scaly spikes of black, dark reddish or dusky brown flowers, which begin erect and then droop when they become heavy.

External links
Calflora: Carex nudata
Jepson Manual (TJM2) treatment of Carex nudata
USDA Plants Profile: Carex nudata
UC CalPhotos gallery: Carex nudata

nudata
Flora of California
Flora of Oregon
Flora of Washington (state)
Flora of the Klamath Mountains
Flora of the Sierra Nevada (United States)
Freshwater plants
Natural history of the California chaparral and woodlands
Plants described in 1880
Taxa named by Sereno Watson
Flora without expected TNC conservation status